Santa Bárbara (English: Saint Barbara) is a Portuguese telenovela broadcast and produced by TVI. It is written by Artur Ribeiro and adapted from the Mexican telenovela La Patrona. The telenovela premiered on September 28, 2015 and is currently airing at 11pm (UTC) primetime slot. It is recorded in the north region of Portugal.

Production
The telenovela was first announced in November 2014 when Artur Ribeiro was reported to be the author of another new telenovela of TVI. The telenovela was supposed to premiere in March 2015. Days after, came the first hints that it would be an adaptation of a Mexican telenovela and La Patrona was the chosen one.

Margarida Marinho was the first actress reported to participate in the telenovela, in the role of Antónia Vidal, one of the main characters of the original plot. But later she moved to the rival broadcaster SIC. Sara Matos and Pedro Teixeira were also actors thought to be part of the telenovela but were never confirmed. Finally, in 2015, Benedita Pereira and Albano Jerónimo were announced as protagonists (Gabriela and Alexandre). In February, São José Correia replaced Margarida Marinho's original role on the telenovela (Antónia Vidal). At that moment, she was still recording the telenovela Jardins Proibidos and TVI had to make some changes so she could abandon that production and join the cast of this one.

Also in February, the telenovela received its first title, Santa Bárbara, which was later announced to be the official one. Santa Bárbara originates from the actual spiritual figure Saint Barbara, believed to be the protector of the miners, which is one of the main plots. The premiere was then delayed to September because TVI extended the length of Jardins Proibidos (on air at that time). TVI tried to convince Joaquim de Almeida to join the cast. This actor is popular worldwide for acting in several TV series such as Revenge, Once Upon a Time, Bones, Miami Vice, etc.. Unfortunately, he wasn't able to accept it but promised a cameo role with the main character Marcelo Vidal.

On April 28, there was a special event to show the entire cast and reveal the first details. It was the first public and official announcement of the production.

Shooting starts only in July and takes place in the north region of Portugal. Just like Belmonte, from the same author, the Portuguese version  of La Patrona has a lot of differences from the original one, but always keeping the core of the story.

The first teasers were launched in August. Another special event (this time to see exclusive parts of the first episodes) took place on September 18, 10 days before the premiere.

Just like the original La Patrona, the first episode of Santa Bárbara ends after the gold mine collapses and Gabriela and Alexandre get caught, leaving the episode in a cliffhanger.

The telenovela is separated in two phases that will mark a major turnaround in Gabriela and a temporal transition of six years. Santa Bárbara has the hard task to maintain the high ratings left by the previous telenovela Jardins Proibidos.

Plot
From the depths of the earth to the heights of high society, Santa Bárbara is the story of Gabriela (Benedita Pereira), a young woman whom everything is taken and returns to regain it all. At the same time, is the story of a forgotten Portuguese town from the inside that will find a new lease with the reopening of ancient gold mines. Just like the protagonist, who will pass the largest adversities in search of a lost love, also the town of Santa Bárbara will be the center of all the events and all the loves and hatreds, conflicts and dreams, dramas and happiness.

Phase 1
The fictional town of Santa Bárbara, once consigned to oblivion, is again on the map with the official reopening of its old gold mines, operated by a consortium led by the powerful Antónia Vidal (São José Correia), a woman who rose in life at the cost of two marriages that ended badly for both husbands - the first died in an accident at the very least suspect and the current dies at her hands, shortly after the opening of the mine that is now under the exclusive control of Antónia and her obsessions.

However, with the death of the patriarch, Alexandre (Albano Jerónimo), the stepson of Antónia who lived in Porto, returns to Santa Bárbara. If the circumstances of this visit would be only for his father's funeral, when Alexandre knows Gabriela, a young woman working in the gold mine, everything will change. Especially when the two are trapped in a mine tunnel after a collapse, where the fact of both running risk of death will link them forever.

The love that grows between Alexandre and Gabriela will be put to the test when Antónia starts machiavelically conspire the destruction of the miner, who will be incriminated and forcibly sent to a mental institution after an explosion at the mine that not only costs life to his own father but also Fernando (Carlotto Cotta), the only son of Antónia, the true responsible for this fatality. Separated from Alexandre and her son, David (Gonçalo Oliveira), alone and with no apparent chance to continue her life in that town, unless closed in an asylum, Gabriela will have to run away and disappear.

Phase 2
Six years later, Santa Bárbara is unrecognizable. With a golf course and a luxury hotel, repopulated with a young and enterprising population, with rural tourism, archaeological museum of ancient Roman mines, river beaches with water sports and large high-class holiday houses. And it is to this new Santa Bárbara that an equally new Gabriela returns.

After years abroad where she won a fortune, Gabriela is back, determined not only to seek vengeance of Antónia but also to restore justice and peace in the town, without forgetting Alexandre and the hope to regain her lost love.

Cast

Main
 Benedita Pereira - Gabriela Soares
 Albano Jerónimo - Alexandre Vidal
 São José Correia - Antónia Vidal

Secondary
 Carlotto Cotta - Fernando Beltrão
 Diana Costa e Silva - Irene Montemor
 Catarina Wallenstein - Júlia Montemor
 Anabela Brígida - Aida Rodrigues
 Luís Gaspar - Macário
 António Capelo - Adriano Viegas
 Luísa Cruz - Constança Monte Claro Viegas
 Pedro Caeiro - Ricardo Viegas
 Filomena Cautela - Maria Ana Rodrigues
 Luís Esparteiro - Júlio Montemor
 Susana Arrais - Francisca Magalhães
 Diego Ramos - Léon Mélendez "léon Suares" 
 Manuela Couto - Paula Montemor
 Gabriela Barros - Patrícia Montemor
 João Lagarto - Zacarias Neves
 Cristina Homem de Mello - Teresa Neves
 Tiago Felizardo - Manuel Neves
 David Carreira - André Neves
 Anna Eremin - Rute Gomes
 Paula Lobo Antunes - Luísa Áquila
 Carla Vasconcelos - Rosa Romeiro
 Romeu Costa - Bernardo Almeida
 Sofia Grillo - Filipa Vieira
 Nuno Pardal - Alberto Espinho
 Marco D'Almeida - Gonçalo Góis
 Pedro Laginha - Eduardo Reis
 Marco Delgado - Rui Lagos
 Catarina Gouveia - Alice Oliveira
 Manuela Maria - Felismina Oliveira
 Jessica Athayde - Ana da Luz
 Almeno Gonçalves - Tomás Soares
 Carlos Oliveira - Vitó Cabral (phase 1)
 Afonso Pimentel - Daniel Figueiredo (phase 2)
 Sofia Ribeiro - Jéssica Garcia (phase 2)
 Jean-Pierre Martins - Olivier Lencastre (phase 2)
 Miguel Taborda - David Soares (phase 2)
 Bruna Quintas -  Sara Faria (phase 2)
 José Condessa - Luís (phase 2)
 Jack Ilco - Zeca (phase 2)

Special Participation
 Joaquim de Almeida - Marcelo Vidal (first episode)

Children
 Gonçalo Oliveira - David Soares (phase 1)
 Sara Mestre - Marisa Vasques (phase 1)

Remakes 
1984: La dueña (filmed in Venezuela and broadcast on VTV Canal 8)
2006: Dueña y Señora (filmed in Puerto Rico and broadcast on Telemundo) starring Karla Monroig & Angel Viera
2013: La Patrona (filmed in Mexico and broadcast on NBC) 
2018: La Patrona (filmed in Mexico and broadcast on Las Estrellas)

References

External links

Portuguese telenovelas
Televisão Independente telenovelas
2015 Portuguese television series debuts
2016 Portuguese television series endings
2015 telenovelas
Portuguese-language telenovelas